Typha × argoviensis is a plant of hybrid origin, native to Switzerland and Germany. It apparently originated as a cross between  the two very widespread species T. latifolia and T. shuttleworthii.  Typha × argoviensis grows in freshwater marshes.

References

argoviensis
Freshwater plants
Plant nothospecies
Flora of Switzerland
Flora of Germany
Plants described in 1897